The 1938 FIRA Tournament was the third Rugby Union European championship, organized by the recently formed FIRA. It was played in Bucharest. Only three teams participated.

Results

Table

Bibliography 

 Francesco Volpe, Valerio Vecchiarelli (2000), 2000 Italia in Meta, Storia della nazionale italiana di rugby dagli albori al Sei Nazioni, GS Editore (2000) 
 Francesco Volpe, Paolo Pacitti (Author), Rugby 2000, GTE Gruppo Editorale (1999).

External links
 FIRA-AER official website

1938
1938 rugby union tournaments for national teams
1937–38 in French rugby union
rugby union
rugby union
International rugby union competitions hosted by Romania